Provincial Trunk Highway 3A (PTH 3A) is a provincial primary highway located in the Canadian province of Manitoba.  It runs from PTH 3 to the same route concurrent with PTH 34. The highway continues as PR 423 from its eastern terminus.

The highway serves as a direct connection to the town of Clearwater, and also is a shortcut.  The speed limit is 90 km/h (55 mph).

Route description

PTH 3A begins at an intersection with PTH 3 (Boundary Commission Trail) in a rural part of the Municipality of Louise. It heads north through the flat farmland of the prairies to cross a bridge over Cypress Creek (closed since 2016) and pass along the eastern edge of Clearwater, where it has an intersection with PR 342 and makes a sharp curve to the east. The highway begins paralleling a former railroad line as it travels along the southern edge of Crystal City, where it comes to an end at an intersection with PTH 3 / PTH 34 (Boundary Commission Trail). The road continues east as gravel PR 423.

The entire length of Manitoba Provincial Trunk Highway 3A is a paved, rural, two-lane highway, located entirely in the Municipality of Louise.

Bridge closure

Since 2016, PTH 3A has been split into two segments, both meeting a dead end at Cypress Creek. This due to the bridge across the creek being closed by the province due to safety concerns. The bridge was a concrete version of a Bowstring arch truss, originally built between 1919 and 1920 by the Winnipeg construction firm of Alex Gall and Company. Its original cost was $13,700. In deteriorating condition, the bridge was closed to vehicular traffic in 2016 and was demolished in spring 2018.

Major intersections

External links 
Official Name and Location - Declaration of Provincial Trunk Highways Regulation - The Highways and Transportation Act - Provincial Government of Manitoba
Official Highway Map - Published and maintained by the Department of Infrastructure - Provincial Government of Manitoba (see Legend and Map#2)
Google Maps Search - Provincial Trunk Highway 3A

References

003A